Albligen (former French name: Albenon) is a former municipality in the Bern-Mittelland administrative district in the canton of Bern in Switzerland. On 1 January 2011, the former municipalities of Wahlern and Albligen merged into the new municipality of Schwarzenburg.

History
Albligen is first mentioned in 1346 as Alblingen.

Geography
Of this area,  or 56.2% is used for agricultural purposes, while or 34.7% is forested. Of the rest of the land,  or 7.5% is settled (buildings or roads),  or 1.4% is either rivers or lakes.

Of the built up area, industrial buildings made up 0.0% of the total area while housing and buildings made up 4.9% and transportation infrastructure made up 2.3%.  32.6% of the total land area is heavily forested and 2.1% is covered with orchards or small clusters of trees.  Of the agricultural land, 26.6% is used for growing crops and 27.7% is pastures, while 1.9% is used for orchards or vine crops.  All the water in the municipality is in rivers and streams.

Albligen lies in the midland of a small bank in the Höchi hills ( above sea level). On the eastern edge of the municipality flows the Sense River.

The neighboring municipalities are Ueberstorf, Wahlern, and Heitenried.

Demographics
Albligen has a population (as of 31 December 2010) of 477.  , 3.2% of the population was made up of foreign nationals.  Over the last 10 years the population has decreased at a rate of -5.7%.  Most of the population speaks German  (97.5%), with French being second most common ( 1.4%) and Romanian being third ( 0.4%).

In the 2007 election the most popular party was the SVP which received 50% of the vote.  The next three most popular parties were the SPS (19.3%), the Green Party (9.6%) and the local small left-wing parties (7.8%).

The age distribution of the population is children and teenagers (0–19 years old) make up 26.5% of the population, while adults (20–64 years old) make up 60.5% and seniors (over 64 years old) make up 13%.  In Albligen about 74.4% of the population (between age 25-64) have completed either non-mandatory upper secondary education or additional higher education (either University or a Fachhochschule).

Albligen has an unemployment rate of 0.75%.  , there were 59 people employed in the primary economic sector and about 20 businesses involved in this sector.  16 people are employed in the secondary sector and there are 7 businesses in this sector.  27 people are employed in the tertiary sector, with 10 businesses in this sector.
The historical population is given in the following table:

References

External links

 

Former municipalities of the canton of Bern
Populated places disestablished in 2011